John Powell (26 April 1931 – 3 August 2008) was an Australian weightlifter. He competed in the men's light heavyweight event at the 1956 Summer Olympics.

References

External links
 

1931 births
2008 deaths
Australian male weightlifters
Olympic weightlifters of Australia
Weightlifters at the 1956 Summer Olympics
20th-century Australian people
21st-century Australian people